Agustín Farabundo Martí Rodríguez (5 May 1893 – 1 February 1932) was a Marxist-Leninist activist and a revolutionary leader in El Salvador during La Matanza.

Early life 

Martí was born in Teotepeque, a farming community located in Departamento de La Libertad, El Salvador. After graduating from Saint Cecilia's Salesian Secondary School  Santa Tecla, he entered the University of El Salvador (San Salvador). Early on, he condemned the exploitation of the country's poor was for the profit of the rich. He became known as a Salvadoran revolutionary and, for many, a martyr.

Revolutionary activity 

Categorized by Miguel Mármol, in his testimonio, an intellectual but a proletarian-like young man, Martí decided to drop out of his Political Science and Jurisprudence program at the University of El Salvador to fight for his community and nation. In 1920, he was arrested for taking part along with other students in a protest against the Meléndez-Quiñónez dynasty, which was ruling the country. His arrest subsequently led to his exile from the country, and he took up residence in Guatemala and Mexico until his return to El Salvador in 1925.

Returning from exile, Martí was appointed as a representative to go to the conference of the Anti-Imperialist League of the Americas in New York City. Upon arriving in New York, he was once again arrested and then released. In the meantime, he  worked with Nicaraguan revolutionary leader Augusto César Sandino.

Martí became involved in the founding of the Communist Party of Central America, and he led a communist alternative to the Red Cross, called International Red Aid, serving as one of its representatives. Its goal was to help poor and underprivileged Salvadorans by the use of the Marxist-Leninist ideology. In December 1930, at the height of the country's economic and social depression, Martí was once again exiled because of his popularity among the nation's poor and rumors of his upcoming nomination for President the next year.

Uprising and death 

Once the new president was elected in 1931, Martí returned to El Salvador and, along with Alfonso Luna and Mario Zapata, began the movement that was later truncated by the military.  They helped start a guerrilla revolt of indigenous farmers. During that time he was acting as the Interim General Secretary of the Party.

The Communist-led peasant uprising against dictator Maximiliano Hernández Martínez, fomented by collapsing coffee prices, enjoyed some initial success, but was soon drowned in a bloodbath, being  crushed by the Salvadoran military ten days after it had begun. Over 30,000 indigenous people were killed at what was to be a "peaceful meeting" in 1932; this became known as "La Matanza" ("The Slaughter").

President Hernández Martínez, who had himself toppled an elected government only weeks earlier, ordered Martí shot after a perfunctory hearing.

See also 

 History of El Salvador
 Politics of El Salvador
 Santa Ana, El Salvador

References

External links 

 Farabundo Martí Youth (official youth of the FMLN)

1893 births
1932 deaths
People from La Libertad Department (El Salvador)
People of Catalan descent
Salvadoran communists
Salvadoran revolutionaries
History of El Salvador
University of El Salvador alumni
People murdered in El Salvador
Assassinated Salvadoran people
Deaths by firearm in El Salvador
1932 crimes in El Salvador
1932 murders in North America
1930s murders in El Salvador